Secret World is a 1969 French drama film and starring Jacqueline Bisset. It was directed by Robert Freeman.

It was originally known as La Promesse'.

Plot
François withdrawn and fearful of riding in cars as a result of an automobile crash that left him an orphan, lives with his middle-aged aunt and uncle, Florence and Philippe in a chateau in Provence.

Cast
 Jacqueline Bisset as Wendy
 Jean-François Vlerick as François (as Jean-François Maurin)
 Gisèle Pascal as Florence
 Pierre Zimmer as Philip / François' uncle
 Marc Porel as Olivier / Philippe's son 
 Paul Bonifas as Gustave / servant
 Chantal Goya as Monique
 Guy d'Avout as Malerar

Box office
According to Fox records the film required $2,300,000 in rentals to break even and by 11 December 1970 had made $900,000 so made a loss to the studio.

See also
 List of French films of 1969

References

External links

Review of film at New York Times
Review of film at Cinema Retro

1969 films
French drama films
1960s French films